The October Palace is a performing arts center in Kyiv, Ukraine. It is officially known as the International Center of Culture and Arts of the Trade Union Federation of Ukraine, while October Palace is used for its brevity.

History
The building was constructed between 1838 and 1842 upon the design of architect Vikentiy Beretti as the Russian "Institute for Noble Maidens", hence the street where it was located was called Instytutska Street. After the revolution, the building was used by the government, including housing for Kyiv's Cheka (later known as the KGB).

Almost completely destroyed in the Second World War, the building was renovated between 1952 and 1959, and named the October Palace of Culture, used primarily as a concert stage. The street was also renamed October Revolution Street.

After the fall of the Soviet Union, it was renamed to its present-day name. Today, it continues to be used as a concert hall. A movie theater wing was recently added. Even now, the Centre remains a real centre of Ukraine's spiritual capital. The library's unique holding amounting to more than 70,000 items. Various events featuring famous writers, composers, diplomats, politicians, members of parliament and other public figures contribute to the spiritual renaissance of Ukraine, inspire people and endow them with ardent creativity. The well-lit and spacious rooms of the Centre's foyer are always capable of hosting exhibitions spectacularly, emphasising their strong points; the Centre hosts various exhibitions: those of painting, photography, consumer goods, technology and so on. The Centre's capabilities range from intimate family celebrations or somewhat larger anniversary celebrations to large international conferences, symposiums, seminars and congresses.

The building is also the main training centre for prominent rhythmic gymnastics training center, the Deriugins School.

During the 2013-2014 Euromaidan protest in Kyiv the October Palace became occupied by protesters. According to Deriugins School pupil Ganna Rizatdinova, after Euromaidan her school discovered that some of their equipment "like a TV set and a kettle, balls and clubs" had disappeared; "it was a strange kind of robbery. We don't know who did it."

In 2018 the British rock band Bring Me the Horizon shoot their music video for the song "Mantra" here.

NKVD execution prison 

During the years 1920-30 in the building about 120,000 people were killed (shot down or by other means). Among them - famous Soviet Ukrainian artists, painters, writers, politicians, professors, teachers, scientists, priests and so on.

Ensembles
 National orchestra of folks instruments
 Jazz orchestra "Muzychna laboratoria" (Music laboratory)
 National ensemble of folk dance "Horlytsia"
 National opera studios
 National ensemble of classic ballet "Prosvit"
 Children ensemble of classic ballet "Etyud"
 Children ensemble of folk songs "Spivanochka"

References

External links
 Official website
 https://web.archive.org/web/20110723173738/http://memorial.kiev.ua/content/view/166/70/
 History
 http://www.umoloda.kyiv.ua/number/548/222/19809/
 https://www.youtube.com/watch?v=DbLrohHjAf0

Performing arts centers in Ukraine
Buildings and structures in Kyiv
Culture in Kyiv
Federation of Trade Unions of Ukraine
NKVD
Maidan Nezalezhnosti
Pecherskyi District